Sarpedon was the name of several figures in Greek mythology.

Sarpedon may also refer to:

Places
 Sarpedon (Cilicia), a town of ancient Cilicia, now in Turkey
 Sarpedon, the ancient name of the Turkish village of Burunucu
 Sarpedon, the island home of Medusa according to Hesiod

Scientific
 2223 Sarpedon, an asteroid that shares the same orbit around the Sun as the planet Jupiter 
 Graphium sarpedon, a species of swallowtail butterfly found in South Asia, Southeast Asia, and Australia

Ships 
 , various ships of the Royal Navy
 SS Sarpedon (1923), a cargo liner of the Blue Funnel Line
 USS Sarpedon (ARB-7), an Aristaeus-class battle damage repair ship

Other uses
 Sarpedon Krater, alternative name for the Euphronios Krater, an ancient Greek terra cotta vase
 Sarpedon, a character in the television series Charmed
 Sarpedon, the childhood teacher of Cato the Younger

See also
 SS Sarpedon